Maximiliano Bustos (born 2 April 1986) is a rugby union footballer who plays as a prop. Bustos was part of the Argentine squad at the 2011 Rugby World Cup.

References

External links
2011 Rugby World Cup Profile

1986 births
Living people
Argentine rugby union players
Argentina international rugby union players
Rugby union props
Sportspeople from Santa Fe, Argentina
Montpellier Hérault Rugby players
Pampas XV players